Gérald Pfefferle (born 23 May 1960) is a Swiss fencer. He competed in the team épée event at the 1988 Summer Olympics.

References

External links
 

1960 births
Living people
Swiss male épée fencers
Olympic fencers of Switzerland
Fencers at the 1988 Summer Olympics